Yan Chau is an islet in the North District in the New Territories of Hong Kong. It is located within Double Haven.

Conservation
The special area includes the islets Pak Ka Chau, Yan Chau (both within Double Haven) as well as the islet of Ap Lo Chun and a part of Ap Chau (both within Crooked Harbour). The geology of the area is characterised by sedimentary rocks of the Jurassic and Cretaceous periods.

References

North District, Hong Kong
Uninhabited islands of Hong Kong